In mathematics, the splitting principle is a technique used to reduce questions about vector bundles to the case of line bundles.

In the theory of vector bundles, one often wishes to simplify computations, say of Chern classes.  Often computations are well understood for line bundles and for direct sums of line bundles.  In this case the splitting principle can be quite useful.

The theorem above holds for complex vector bundles and integer coefficients or for real vector bundles with  coefficients. In the complex case, the line bundles  or their first characteristic classes are called Chern roots.

The splitting principle admits many variations. The following, in particular, concerns real vector bundles and their complexifications:

Symmetric polynomial
Under the splitting principle, characteristic classes for complex vector bundles correspond to symmetric polynomials in the first Chern classes of complex line bundles; these are the Chern classes.

See also

K-theory
Grothendieck splitting principle for holomorphic vector bundles on the complex projective line

References

  section 3.1
Raoul Bott and Loring Tu. Differential Forms in Algebraic Topology, section 21.

Characteristic classes
Vector bundles
Mathematical principles